John Eugene Perkins (April 21, 1953 – April 25, 2007) was an American football wide receiver in the National Football League who spent his entire career with the New York Giants. Perkins was born in Franklin, Texas. He played college football at Ranger College before transferring to Abilene Christian University. A second round draft pick in the 1977 NFL Draft, Perkins played in 71 games and had 2,611 yards receiving and 18 touchdowns on 163 catches. He retired after the 1983 season. He died in Fort Worth, Texas after complications from heart surgery.

Perkins is the father of WNBA player Jia Perkins.

Johnny Perkins Field in Granbury, TX, is the home field of the Granbury Pirate football team.

References

1953 births
2007 deaths
Players of American football from Texas
Ranger Rangers football players
American football wide receivers
Abilene Christian Wildcats football players
New York Giants players
People from Franklin, Texas